Roberto Castellanos Braña (7 October 1950 – February or March 1980) was a Salvadoran racewalker. He competed in the men's 20 kilometres walk at the 1968 Summer Olympics. In February 1980, both him and his wife were arrested by the police, with their bodies found in an open grave a few weeks later.

References

1950 births
1980 deaths
Athletes (track and field) at the 1968 Summer Olympics
Salvadoran male racewalkers
Olympic athletes of El Salvador
Place of birth missing